Bandaragama electoral district was an electoral district of Sri Lanka between March 1960 and February 1989. The district was named after the town of Bandaragama in Kalutara District, Western Province. The 1978 Constitution of Sri Lanka introduced the proportional representation electoral system for electing members of Parliament. The existing 160 mainly single-member electoral districts were replaced with 22 multi-member electoral districts. Bandaragama electoral district was replaced by the Kalutara multi-member electoral district at the 1989 general elections.

Members of Parliament
Key

Elections

1960 (March) Parliamentary General Election
Results of the 4th parliamentary election held on 19 March 1960 for the district:

1960 (July) Parliamentary General Election
Results of the 5th parliamentary election held on 20 July 1960 for the district:

1965 Parliamentary General Election
Results of the 6th parliamentary election held on 22 March 1965 for the district:

1967 Parliamentary By-Election
Following the 1965 parliamentary elections two election petitions were lodged with the courts seeking the election results be declared void on the grounds that Perera or persons acting on his behalf published false statements in relation to the personal character of D. C. W. Kannangara. They were initially dismissed by the Election Judge on 5 June 1966, whereupon an appeal was lodged by the claimants to the Supreme Court. The Supreme Court determined on 12 May 1967 that the Election Judge had misdirected himself in law and a fresh election for the seat of Bandaragama was called and held on 23 September 1967.

Results of the 1967 parliamentary by-election held on 23 September 1967:

1969 Parliamentary By-Election
Following the 1967 parliamentary by-election, a further petitions was lodged with the courts seeking the election results be declared void on the grounds that Perera should have been disqualified from running in the previous by-election, on the grounds that the Supreme Court ruling in 1967 disqualified him under the constitution. Following a hearing in June 1968 the Supreme Court decided the results of the 1967 by-election be declared void.

1970 Parliamentary General Election
Results of the 7th parliamentary election held on 27 May 1970 for the district:

1977 Parliamentary General Election
Results of the 8th parliamentary election held on 21 July 1977 for the district:

References

Former electoral districts of Sri Lanka
Politics of Kalutara District